The Maryland gubernatorial election of 2010 was held on November 2, 2010. Seven charter counties chose elected officeholders in their county: Anne Arundel County, Baltimore County, Harford County, Howard County, Montgomery County, Prince George's County, and Wicomico County.

The County elected offices include: County Council, State's Attorney, Sheriff, Clerk of the Circuit Court, Probate Judge, and Register of Wills.

This page describes notable races and candidates.

Anne Arundel County

Declared Candidates

District 1

District 2

District 3

District 4

District 5

District 6

District 7

Baltimore County

Declared Candidates

District 1

District 2

District 3

District 4

District 5

District 6

District 7

Democrats
John Olszewski, Sr - Incumbent
Buzz Beeler - Former Baltimore County Police Officer, Author

Potential Candidates

District 1

District 2

District 3

District 4

District 5

District 6

District 7

Harford County

Declared Candidates

Republicans

Democrats

Greens

Potential Candidates

Republicans

Democrats

Greens

Howard County

Declared Candidates

Democrats

Republicans

Greens

Potential Candidates

Democrats

Republicans

Greens

Montgomery County

At-Large

Declared Candidates

Potential Candidates

Democrats
 Marc Elrich, incumbent
 Nancy Floreen, incumbent
 George Leventhal, incumbent
 Duchy Trachtenberg, incumbent

Republicans

District 1

Democrats
 Roger Berliner, incumbent

Republicans

District 2

Democrats
 Craig Rice, incumbent

Republicans

District 3

Democrats
 Phil Andrews, incumbent

Republicans

District 4

Democrats
Nancy Navarro, incumbent

Republicans

District 5

Democrats
 Valerie Ervin, incumbent

Republicans

Prince George's County

Declared Candidates

Democrats

Republicans

Potential Candidates

Democrats

Republicans

Wicomico County

References

See also

County offices
County government in Maryland
Maryland county offices